The United Left was a political alliance in Argentina. It was an alliance of several groups, chiefly the Communist Party of Argentina and the Socialist Workers' Movement.

In the 2003 presidential elections the party's candidate was former deputy Patricia Walsh, coming in seventh with 1.8 percent of the vote.

Communist Party of Argentina
Defunct political party alliances in Argentina
Political parties with year of disestablishment missing
Political parties with year of establishment missing